Per Olaf Olsen (13 May 1871 – 18 March 1919) was a Norwegian sports shooter. He competed in the 300 metre free rifle event at the 1908 Summer Olympics.

References

1871 births
1919 deaths
Norwegian male sport shooters
Olympic shooters of Norway
Shooters at the 1908 Summer Olympics
Sportspeople from Drammen